The Hualien County Stone Sculptural Museum is a museum of stone sculpture in Hualien City, Hualien County, Taiwan.

History
The museum was opened in 2001 as the first stone sculpture museum in Taiwan.

Architecture
The museum is a two-story building constructed with Shimizu form work and piled stones. The building has a modern architecture with high ceilings. The museum building also hosts the head office of Hualien County Cultural Affairs Bureau.

Exhibitions
The museum includes the following exhibition areas:
 Collection area
 Exhibition area
 Modern stone sculpturing area
 Traditional stone sculpturing area
 Video and audio area

Transportation
The museum is accessible by bus from Hualien Station of Taiwan Railways.

See also
 List of museums in Taiwan

References

External links
 

2001 establishments in Taiwan
Hualien City
Museums established in 2001
Museums in Hualien County
Sculpture galleries in Taiwan
Stone sculptures